Shush Ab (also Romanized as Shūsh Āb; also known as Shūshābād) is a village in Haram Rud-e Olya Rural District, in the Central District of Malayer County, Hamadan Province, Iran. At the 2006 census, its population was 518, in 119 families.

References 

Populated places in Malayer County